Tour Anfibio is second concert tour by Colombian singer and songwriter Shakira support of her fourth studio album Dónde Están los Ladrones? (2000). that started on March 21, 2000, in Lima, and ended on May 12 in Buenos Aires. The tour was sponsored by Nokia during the South American legs of the tour.

About the tour
The tour's setlist consisted of songs from her albums Pies Descalzos and Dónde Están los Ladrones? In addition, she included an a capella song, "Alfonsina y el mar", originally by Argentine folk singer Mercedes Sosa. 

Criticism of the tour was the overselling of tickets in Guatemala, the long delays at the start of the show, and the short duration of the tour. Despite this criticism, almost all of the concerts were quickly sold out, and Shakira even added some extra concerts due to popular demand.

After 3 sold out shows in Luna Park, Shakira decided to bring back the tour to Buenos Aires because of popular demand. A fourth date was added, taking place at Campo Argentino de Polo. The show had around 25,000 attendees. The show had people in the blocks near the stadium to prevent overcrowding of the region and, according to residents' testimonies, the loud music caused the buildings to shake. The concerts at National Auditorium, Mexico City, and Luna Park, Buenos Aires, were broadcast on national television.

Critical reception

Ernesto Lechner From ‘’LA Times’’ praised the concert and the artist saying “Everything about Colombian rock star Shakira spells perfection--with a capital P. Her powerful voice. Her gorgeous looks. Her effortlessly sensuous dancing. Her commanding stage presence.” Highlighting Ojos Asi by calling it “superb”, and asserting that her shows are meant to be seen live.

Setlist
 "¿Dónde estás corazón?"
 "Si te vas"
 "Inevitable"
 "Dónde Están los Ladrones?"
 "Antología"
 "Ojos así"
 "Octavo día"
 "Moscas en la casa"
 "Ciega, sordomuda"
 "Tú"
 "Alfonsina y el mar"
 "Pies descalzos, sueños blancos"
 "Estoy Aquí"

Encore
"Sombra De ti""No creo"

Tour dates

Box office score data

References

External links
 VH1 Driven: Shakira (video)
Woman Full Of Grace by Ximena Diego Shakira: Woman Full of Grace ~ Ximena Diego ~ eBookMall ~ eBooks

Shakira concert tours
2000 concert tours